Tarte Cosmetics is an American cosmetics company headquartered in New York City.

It was founded by Maureen Kelly in 1999; her first product was a cheek stain that was used the following year for the cover of Self magazine. Also in 2000, Tarte Cosmetics debuted its first order at Henri Bendel. In 2003, Tarte products were being stocked by Sephora and in 2005 at QVC. By 2010, the company's products were being sold by Ulta Beauty.

Tarte products are sold in U.S. department stores, including Macy's and Beauty Brands, and in Sephora stores internationally.

History 
Tarte Cosmetics was founded by Maureen Kelly. She was pursuing a PhD in psychology at Columbia University when she decided to pursue her interest in cosmetics because she could not find effective makeup she liked; she wanted natural makeup that gave a glamorous look. Kelly started the company with the support of her first husband. Kelly began to research cosmetics and worked out of her apartment until her cheek stain was developed. The cheek stain caught the attention of beauty writers a week after launching in Henri Bendel. Kelly spent much of the first two years delivering sample products to the mail rooms of magazine publishers, hoping they would invite her back. As sales continued, Tarte launched in Sephora in 2003 and two years later on QVC.

In March 2014, a 93.5 percent stake in Tarte Cosmetics was acquired for $135 million by Japanese company Kosé Corporation, which wanted to expand into North America.

In June 2018, Tarte announced the revival of its sister brand, Awake, which produces a line of cruelty-free skincare products.

Ingredients 
Maureen Kelly has stated that she wanted makeup that uses natural ingredients, including Amazonian clay, goji berry extract, passionfruit and vitamins A, C, and E.

Tarte Cosmetics does not use parabens, mineral oil, synthetic fragrances or gluten in their products. Parabens are excluded because they are known to disrupt hormones. Mineral oil is also not included because it clogs pores and can be contaminated with toxins. Synthetic fragrances are avoided due to the risk of allergic reactions. Gluten is not included because if it is accidentally consumed, it will cause a reaction.

Tarte is a cruelty-free makeup brand. They do not test on animals or sell products where animal testing is legal. Tarte is certified by PETA. Tarte is not 100% vegan, but some of their individual products contain only vegan ingredients.

Philanthropy 
Maureen Kelly partnered with Sustainable Amazon Partnership, which encouraged forest stewardship, created new jobs, boosted living conditions, and offered educational opportunities. On 28 August 2017, Tarte announced the company's support of an anti-cyberbullying campaign with the Tyler Clementi Foundation. Tarte asked consumers to take a self-portrait and upload it to Instagram with a hashtag  #kissandmakeup. For each self-portrait uploaded,  a donation was made to the foundation and one poster received a lifetime supply of Tarte Cosmetics.

References

External links
 

2000 establishments in New York City
Companies based in New York City
Cosmetics brands
Cosmetics companies of the United States